Hummelsbüttel is a quarter of Hamburg, Germany in the Wandsbek borough.

Geography
Hummelsbüttel borders the quarters Poppenbüttel and Wellingsbüttel, as well as the quarters Langenhorn, Fuhlsbüttel, and Ohlsdorf in Hamburg-Nord.

Politics
These are the results of Hummelsbüttel in the Hamburg state election:

References 

Quarters of Hamburg
Harburg, Hamburg